Dragan Lukovski (born March 21, 1975) is a retired Macedonian-born Serbian professional basketball player. Dragan and his father Janko Lukovski, former coach are now owners of basketball club "Sport Key" in Novi Sad (Serbia).

He has two kids: Lola Lukovski and Dimitrije Lukovski, who currently live in Belgrade.

External links
TBLStat.net Profile
LNB.fr profile

1975 births
Living people
Basketball players at the 2000 Summer Olympics
BC Kyiv players
Élan Béarnais players
Fenerbahçe men's basketball players
KK Crvena zvezda players
KK Partizan players
KK Spartak Subotica players
KK Vojvodina players
Limoges CSP players
Macedonian expatriate basketball people in Serbia
Macedonian people of Serbian descent
Makedonikos B.C. players
Olympic basketball players of Yugoslavia
Panionios B.C. players
Point guards
Serbian men's basketball coaches
Serbian expatriate basketball people in Greece
Serbian expatriate basketball people in France
Serbian expatriate basketball people in Turkey
Serbian expatriate basketball people in Ukraine
Serbian men's basketball players
Sportspeople from Skopje
Serbian people of Macedonian descent
FIBA World Championship-winning players
1998 FIBA World Championship players